Chlorosoma dunupyana is a species of venomous snake of the family Colubridae.

Geographic range
The snake is found in Brazil.

References 

Reptiles described in 2020
Chlorosoma
Snakes of South America
Endemic fauna of Brazil
Reptiles of Brazil